Helen Langton is a British academic, a nurse and the current vice chancellor of the University of Suffolk.

Career 
Langton held numerous position within the Universities in United Kingdom such associate Dean at both Coventry University and University of Derby. She was previously deputy Vice Chancellor of University of South Wales.

She has been a member of both National and International Bodies such as Nursing and Midwifery Council, Academy of Health care Improvement, Associate editor of International Journals of Child Health Care, and Board Member for the De Souza Nursing Institute in Toronto Canada.

References 

University of Suffolk
Year of birth missing (living people)
Living people
Education in Suffolk